Microhyla rubra is a species of narrow-mouthed frog endemic to India. Earlier thought to exist also in Sri Lanka, new studies suggested that Sri Lankan population is a different species, now elevated to species level as Microhyla mihintalei.

Description
Habit stout. Snout rounded, a little shorter than the diameter of the orbit ; interorbital space broader than the upper eyelid. Fingers moderate, first much shorter than second ; toes moderate, one-third webbed ; tips of fingers and toes not swollen ; subarticular tubercles very distinct ; two rather large, oval, compressed, very prominent metatarsal tubercles, outer somewhat larger than inner. The tibio-tarsal articulation reaches somewhat beyond the shoulder, never to the eye. Skin smooth. Reddish brown above, sides darker; a dark brown line from the tip of the snout through the eye along the side of the back to the groin ; a dark brown mark across the thigh, beginning on the loin ; limbs with more or less distinct dark cross bars ; sometimes a dark X-shaped marking on the anterior portion of the back, commencing between the eyes ; beneath whitish, immaculate or with a few brown dots on the 
throat. Male with a subgular vocal sac, and the throat black.

From snout to vent 1.2 inches. Some adults have been observed dwelling in elephant dung.

Tadpole of Microhyla rubra 
The tadpole of Microhyla rubra has a transparent body with a long, tapering whip like tail. In dorsal view, body clearly differentiated into two parts, a longer and wider anterior region and a narrower posterior region. Anterior region almost twice as long and wide as posterior region. Eyes small and snout rounded. Head and body posterior to eyes with sides parallel to each other. Eyes directed slightly dorsolaterally, bulbous, and entire eye visible through epidermis due to dearth of pigmentation. Nares closed, narial depressions visible, located immediately anterior to two small concentrated patches of pigment, anterodorsolaterally directed, and closer to snout tip than to pupils. Nasolacrimal duct apparent. Mouth narrow, superior, lower and upper-lips both visible. Tail long, tapering, with a whip-like flagellum.

Tadpoles of  Microhyla rubra lack keratinized mouth parts and have a dorsoterminal mouth. They have six papillae (scallops) on the 
lower lip but number varies with developmental stage.

The preferred habitats of M. rubra tadpoles are ephemeral pools which have less aquatic predators. Since the ephemeral pools dry rapidly after the rainy period tadpoles have to adapt to this condition by having a rapid growth rate. M. rubra tadpoles live in water close to the surface and feed on plankton and suspended food particles.

References

 Bowatte & Meegaskumbura. 2011. 
RAo CRN. 1918. Notes on tadpoles of Indian Engystomatidae. Records of Indian Museum 15:41-45.
Mac iWeb Publications

rubra
Frogs of India
Endemic fauna of India
Taxa named by Thomas C. Jerdon
Amphibians described in 1854